NGC 183 is an elliptical galaxy located in the constellation Andromeda. It was discovered on November 5, 1866 by Truman Safford.

References

External links
 

0183
Elliptical galaxies
Discoveries by Truman Safford
Andromeda (constellation)
002298